Hedströmmen is a river located in Bergslagen in Sweden.

References

Rivers of Västmanland County
Norrström basin
Rivers of Dalarna County